The Daniel and Clarissa Baldwin House is a historic house located at 1018 Dugway Road in Spencertown, Columbia County, New York, United States.

Description and history 
The house was built in about 1807, and is a two-story, five-bay wide, Federal style frame dwelling with a rear kitchen ell. It has a low pitched side gable roof and interior gable end chimneys. A front piazza supported by four Doric order columns was added about 1880. Also on the property are the contributing barn (c. 1835), ice house, stone dam, and garage.

It was added to the National Register of Historic Places on June 27, 2012.

References 

Houses on the National Register of Historic Places in New York (state)
Federal architecture in New York (state)
Houses completed in 1807
Houses in Columbia County, New York
National Register of Historic Places in Columbia County, New York